Muhammad Arif Abbasi is a Pakistani politician who was a Member of the Provincial Assembly of the Punjab, from May 2013 to May 2018.

Early life and education
He was born on 12 February 1965.

He received the Diploma of Associate Engineers from the School of Aeronautics in Karachi in 1987.

Political career
He was elected to the Provincial Assembly of the Punjab as a candidate of Pakistan Tehreek-e-Insaf from Constituency PP-13 (Rawalpindi-XIII) in 2013 Pakistani general election.

References

Living people
Punjab MPAs 2013–2018
1965 births
Pakistan Tehreek-e-Insaf politicians